Mondo Sex Head is the second remix album by Rob Zombie, containing remixes of the tracks of various past albums both by Zombie and his former band White Zombie. It was curated and executive produced by Jason Bentley. The original cover art depicted Zombie's wife Sheri Moon Zombie. It caused controversy and was replaced by an image of a kitten. Rob Zombie explained, "I never thought it would be a problem since it seemed tame to me... but it was. No one would carry the CD. Anything with death and violence is totally fine, but anything with sex, forget about it. So instead of censoring that cover and ruining it, I just removed the ass shot and replaced it with a pussy shot."  Though the vinyl release remained unchanged with the original cover art.

Track listing

Bonus tracks

EPs
Prior to the release of Mondo Sex Head, two digital-only EPs were released that featured tracks from the full-length version in addition to exclusive bonus tracks.

Music video
A video was created for "Dragula (+++ Remix)" but never officially released.

References

2012 remix albums
Rob Zombie albums
Geffen Records albums
Obscenity controversies in music